Dioscorea balcanica is a herbaceous perennial in the family Dioscoreaceae.

Description 
Height 2–5 m. Flowers cup-shaped, arranged in racemes, producing loculicidal capsules.

Taxonomy 
This species was named in 1914 by Nedeljko Kosanin (1874–1934), manager (1906–1934) of the Jevremovac botanical gardens in Belgrade, Serbia.

Distribution 
Balkans: Montenegro to North Albania (see map). As such it is the only wild Dioscorea species found on the Balkan Peninsula where it is endemic. It is considered an endangered species and has been placed under protection.

References

Bibliography 

 
 Distribution maps
 
 
 

balcanica